Hubert Robson Razakananantena (born January 17, 1974) is a Malagasy footballer currently plays for Fanilo Japan Actuels.

External links
 

1974 births
Living people
Malagasy footballers
Madagascar international footballers
Association football midfielders
Japan Actuel's FC players